Binge Networks is a subscription-based video streaming service. It was founded by Bonnie Bruderer, who serves as CEO. The platform provides the ability to globally and instantly syndicate and monetize content through key strategic partnerships.

Background 
Binge Networks headquarters is located in Florida.  It has built into over 100 smart TV networks allowing content creators to syndicate and monetize. Some of Binge's streaming media platforms are Apple, Roku, and Amazon apps.

Selected Programming 

 Unicorn Hunters
 DreamOWay (hosted by Selena Gomez), TBA
 Better Than Gossip: Ageless Advice for Timeless Women
 The Girlfriend Hour!
 Anyone But Me
 Daily Flash Network
 Mr. Biz Network
 Homeless Sam & Sally
 Iron Dragon TV
 Cyber Life
 Alaska Outdoors Magazine
 Chef Eric’s Culinary Classroom
 United Fight Alliance
 Trace Sport Stars
 Let’s Go See
 Tokens, stayed on Binge for the first season and was later sold to Urbanflix TV
 ChimneySwift11

References

External links 

 Official website

Android (operating system) software
Video on demand services
IOS software